Berney is a surname. Notable people with the surname include:

Antonio Berney (died 1784), French teacher
Berney baronets
Jim Berney, visual effects artist
Jon Berney (born 1976), Australian rower
Leonard Berney (1920–2016), British soldier

See also
Berner